Gateway Newstands  is a chain of convenience stores and kiosks in large office buildings, shopping centres, public places, and transit stations in the United States and Canada. Established in 1983, Vaughan, Ontario-based Tobmar Investments International Inc. (known simply as Tobmar) is the company that runs Gateway Newstands. The stores operate as independent franchisees and sell a wide variety of convenience items from tobacco and lottery tickets; to candy, chewing gum, and non-alcoholic beverages; and newspapers and magazines. There are currently over 500 Gateway franchises in the network. In late 2020, Gateway Newstands, along with its affiliate Tobmar Investments International Inc., decided to wind-down operations at its franchise locations in the United States. 

By May 2022, Gateway Newstands had filed for creditor protection with Gateway owing creditors $20 million. In 2020 and 2021, about 40 Gateway locations had closed dropping from 191 locations at the beginning of 2020 to 150 in April 2022. The business decline was attributed to a lack of foot traffic due to the COVID-19 pandemic.

Gateway Newstands once operated over 300 locations in US and Canada in major urban centers. It had 65 locations in the Toronto subway system since the mid-1990s. It is the exclusive newsstand retailer in North America’s 3rd largest transit system, the Toronto Transit Commission. Competitors to Gateway Newstands accused the Toronto Transit Commission of sole-sourcing.

References

Convenience stores of Canada